is a railway station on the Shinetsu Main Line in the town of Tagami, Niigata, Japan, operated by East Japan Railway Company (JR East).

Lines
Tagami Station is served by the Shinetsu Main Line and is 111.1 kilometers from the terminus of the line at Naoetsu Station.

Station layout

The station consists of two ground-level opposed side platforms connected by a footbridge, serving two tracks. The station is unattended.

Platforms

History
Tagami Station opened on 28 May 1949. With the privatization of Japanese National Railways (JNR) on 1 April 1987, the station came under the control of JR East.

Surrounding area
 
Yutagami Onsen

See also
 List of railway stations in Japan

External links
 JR East station information 

Railway stations in Niigata Prefecture
Railway stations in Japan opened in 1949
Shin'etsu Main Line
Stations of East Japan Railway Company
Tagami, Niigata